The Houston mayoral election of 2013 took place on November 5, 2013. The incumbent Mayor Annise Parker was re-elected to a third, and final, two-year term in office.

Candidates
Declared candidates include:
Incumbent Mayor Annise Parker (Democratic)
Former City Attorney Ben Hall (Democratic)
Don Cook (Green)
Eric Dick (Republican)
Victoria Lane
Michael J. Fitzsimmons(Socialist)
Keryl Burgess Douglas

Endorsements

Parker's endorsers include:
Houston Police Officers Union
EMILY's List
Houston Contractor's Association
Human Rights Campaign
Planned Parenthood
Annie's List
Houston Apartment Association
American Council of Engineering Companies – Houston
Christians For Better Government
Democracy For America
Democracy for Houston
Gay & Lesbian Victory Fund
Greater Harris County Democrats
Greater Houston Home Builders’ Association
Harris County AFL-CIO
Harris County Council of Organizations
Harris County Tejano Democrats
Houston Apartment Association
Houston Association of Realtors
Houston Building Owners and Managers Association (BOMA)
Houston Chronicle
Houston Contractors Association
Houston Educational Support Personnel (HESP) Union, Local 6315
Houston Stonewall Young Democrats
Houstonians for Responsible Growth
Human Rights Campaign
Ironworkers Local 84
Key PAC
LPAC
Montrose Area Democrats
Planned Parenthood Gulf Coast Action Fund
Reinforcing Iron Workers Local 847
Small Independent Motel Owners Association
UNITE HERE! Local 23
Women’s Campaign Fund
U.S. President, Barack Obama
Former Congressman Chris Bell
State Sen. Sylvia Garcia
State Rep. Garnet Coleman
State Rep. Jessica Farrar
State Rep. Ana Hernandez
State Rep. Borris Miles
State Rep. Gene Wu
Former State Rep. Debra Danburg
Former State Rep. Scott Hochberg
Former State Rep. Glen Maxey
Former State Rep. Kristi Thibaut
Former State District Judge Dwight Jefferson
Ft. Bend County Commissioner Richard Morrison
Harris County Attorney Vince Ryan
Councilmember Ellen Cohen
Councilmember Stephen Costello
Councilmember Ed Gonzalez
Councilmember Al Hoang
Councilmember James Rodriguez
Former Councilmember Peter Brown
Former Councilmember Ada Edwards
Former Councilmember Graciela Saenz
HCDE Trustee Debby Kerner
HCDE Trustee Erica Lee
HCDE Trustee Diane Trautman
HISD Trustee Anna Eastman
HISD Trustee Juliet Stipeche
HISD Trustee Paula Harris
Former HCC Trustee Jay K. Aiyer
Missouri City Councilmember Danny Nguyen
Ambassador Arthur Schechter
Radio hosts, Roula Christie and Ryan Chase of 104.1 KRBE

Hall's endorsers include:

African-American Police Officers League
Yolanda Adams
Former Judge Levi Benton
City Councilmember Clarence Bradford
Former Mayor Lee P. Brown
Constable Reuben Davis
Congressman' Al GreenHISD Trustee Carol Mims GallowayFormer City Councilmember Jarvis JohnsonCity Council candidate Michael KuboshFormer Houston Astros owner Drayton McLaneHCC Trustee Chris OliverFormer Congressman Solomon OrtizFormer United States Secretary of Education Rod PaigeConstable Alan RosenConstable Mary WalkerFormer Congressman Craig WashingtonFormer Judge David WestHCC Trustee Michael P. WilliamsFormer Judge'' Alvin Zimmerman
Radio hosts, Walton and Johnson of KPRC 950

Results

See also
Politics of Houston
Houston City Council

References

Mayoral election, 2013
Houston mayoral
Houston
2013
Non-partisan elections